The Râul Mare (upstream from its confluence with the Șes also: Lăpușnic) is a left tributary of the river Strei in Romania. It discharges into the Strei in Subcetate. Its source is in the Retezat Mountains. It flows through the reservoirs Gura Apelor, Ostrovul Mic, Păclișa and Hațeg.

Tributaries
The following rivers are tributaries to the Râul Mare (from source to mouth):

Left: Peleaga, Scocul Drăcșanului, Paltina, Berhina, Pârâul Cascadelor, Lăpușnicul Mic, Șes, Valea Pietrei, Bistra, Bonciu, Șipotu, Valea Jurii, Râul Galben
Right: Bucura, Judele, Vâlcelul Sugărilor, Pârâu din Zlata, Rădeșul Mic, Zlata, Runcu, Râul Căldărilor, Râușor, Valea Dâljii, Sibișel

References

External links

Rivers of Romania
Rivers of Hunedoara County